Tracy Donald Jones (born March 31, 1961) is a former professional baseball outfielder who played for five Major League Baseball teams from 1986 to 1991.

Career
Jones played at Loyola Marymount University in Los Angeles and was drafted by the New York Mets in the 4th round of the 1982 amateur draft, but did not sign. In January 1983, Jones was selected as the first overall pick of the secondary phase of the amateur draft by the Cincinnati Reds.

Jones debuted with the Reds on April 7, 1986, with the Reds hosting the Philadelphia Phillies. In his first at-bat, he flied out facing Hall-of-Famer Steve Carlton. In his next at-bat, he walked, and his next time up he singled off Carlton for his first hit. In 1987, he had his most productive season as he played in 116 games, batted .290, and stole 31 bases.

In 1988, Jones was traded with Pat Pacillo to the Montreal Expos for Jeff Reed, Herm Winningham, and Randy St. Claire.

Jones would later be traded to the San Francisco Giants (for Mike Aldrete), the Detroit Tigers (for Pat Sheridan), and the Seattle Mariners (for Darnell Coles). He played his final game with the Mariners on October 6, 1991.

Jones was co-host (with Eddie Fingers) of a popular afternoon radio show on radio station WLW in Cincinnati and co-host with longtime Reds' announcer Marty Brennaman on "Brennaman & Jones on Baseball." He was fired and/or laid off September 8, 2017, according to press reports.

Jones is also owner of Tracy Jones Financial, a financial services planning firm. He lives in Bellevue, Kentucky with his wife, Denae.

Jones' son, Hunter, was drafted in the 11th round of the 2010 MLB first year player draft by the Cleveland Indians. He played for two seasons on the Indians' Arizona League rookie league team and in 2012 he played for the Mahoning Valley Scrappers Indians' Class A affiliate in the New York–Penn League. He was one of nine players released by the Indians on March 23, 2013.

Batting stats
 493 Games
 356 Hits
 27 Home runs
 164 RBIs
 62 Stolen bases
 .273 Batting average

References

External links
  
 Baseball Almanac

1961 births
Living people
American expatriate baseball players in Canada
Baseball players from California
Cincinnati Reds players
Denver Zephyrs players
Detroit Tigers players
Eugene Emeralds players
Loyola Marymount Lions baseball players
Major League Baseball left fielders
Montreal Expos players
Nashville Sounds players
San Francisco Giants players
Seattle Mariners players
Sportspeople from Hawthorne, California
Tampa Tarpons (1957–1987) players
Vancouver Canadians players
Vermont Reds players